Blue Ash Air Station (also known as Blue Ash Air National Guard Station) is an Air National Guard facility located in Blue Ash, Ohio, United States, about  north of the former Cincinnati–Blue Ash Airport. It has been the home of the Ohio Air National Guard's 123rd Air Control Squadron since November 1953. , it was estimated to contribute $ annually to the local economy. An LTV A-7 Corsair II is on display at the station.

References

External links 
 

Installations of the United States Air National Guard
Installations of the United States Air Force in Ohio
Buildings and structures in Hamilton County, Ohio
1953 establishments in Ohio
Blue Ash, Ohio